Majo-kit is a toy line developed by the Majorette company of France. Together, they form a complete city traffic environment that also includes farms and factories.

Majo-kits are made from plastic materials with a certain amount of detail. They were designed for children and should not be considered an accurate representation of anything in particular. The separate pieces snap together to form scale size towns and cities for Majorette or other similar size model vehicles. Children are introduced to rules of the road by laying out and obeying traffic signs, and learn to navigate streets with road issues, roundabouts and traffic lights. The Majo-kit buildings are actually too big for the Majorette vehicles but they needed to be a certain size to make them easy to assemble for smaller children.

Many different kits with their own theme were made and all are compatible with each other. This allows children (it was mostly aimed at boys) to keep adding streets and structures. The kits were sold in Europe, Canada, Costa Rica, Australia, New Zealand and the United States. All of the Majo-kit figures are men, and there are no women or children.

Pieces 
Individual pieces included but were not limited to:

 Bus stop shelters 
 Trees
 Park benches
 Fountains
 Flowers and pots
 Picnic benches and tables
 Exterior lighting
 Canopies and shelters
 Fire hydrants  
 Emergency call boxes    
 Phone booths
 Traffic signs
 Changeable (by hand) traffic lights
 Cross walk inserts 
 Auto repair items such as lifts and tools   
 Fuel pumps
 Guard rails 
 Fencing
 Supports 
 Farm accessories 
 Parking meters
 Toll booths

Kits 
Two or more small kits were packaged together as a larger kit sold at a lower price than that of the small kits separately.

Examples of sets or kits include:
 
 Post office
 Restaurant
 Hotel
 Bank
 Hospital
 Gas stations (includes Esso stations, Shell stations, and a generic self-service version) 
 Car wash
 Car repair shops
 Filling station
 Fire station
 Police station  
 Toll booth and customs post
 Airport
 Farm
 Factory

 
There were also smaller kits consisting of figures, a Majorette vehicle, stickers for the vehicle and various tools or other items. These were like Lego's mini-figure sets. Some of these include:

 Construction Crew (with construction vehicle, hardhats, jackhammer & other tools)
 Firefighters
 Medical squad
 Police squad
 Farmers
 Gardeners
 Mechanics

References

1980s toys